The giant aye-aye (Daubentonia robusta) is an extinct relative of the aye-aye, the only other species in the genus Daubentonia. It lived in Madagascar, appears to have disappeared less than 1,000 years ago, is entirely unknown in life, and is only known from subfossil remains.

As of 2004 giant aye-aye remains consisted of 4 incisors, a tibia, and other postcranial material. Subfossils of this species have been found in the southern and southeastern portion of Madagascar, outside the range of extant aye-aye. Giant aye-ayes are believed to be very similar morphologically to the aye-aye, but 2 to 2.5 times larger, based upon jaw and incisor measurements.

References

Nilsson, G. (1983). The Endangered Species Handbook. 

Subfossil lemurs
Holocene extinctions
Mammals described in 1935
Fossil taxa described in 1935
Taxa named by Charles Lamberton